Radovan Trefný (born September 20, 1987) is a Slovak former professional ice hockey defenceman.

Trefný played 234 regular season games in the Tipsport Liga for HK Dukla Trenčín, HK Nitra and ŠHK 37 Piešťany. He also played in the Ligue Magnus for Lions de Lyon during the 2014–15 season before returning to Dukla Trenčín on May 25, 2015. He returned to France the following year with Dogs de Cholet of the FFHG Division 1.

References

External links

1987 births
Living people
HK Dukla Trenčín players
LHC Les Lions players
HK Nitra players
HK 95 Panthers Považská Bystrica players
ŠHK 37 Piešťany players
HK 91 Senica players
Slovak ice hockey defencemen
Sportspeople from Trenčín
Slovak expatriate sportspeople in France
Slovak expatriate ice hockey people
Expatriate ice hockey players in France